Banov or Bánov may refer to:

 Bánov, Slovakia, a municipality and village
TJ Jednota Bánová, a Slovak football team from Bánov
 Bánov (Uherské Hradiště District), a municipality and village in the Czech Republic
 Banov, a village in Poeni, Teleorman commune in Romania
Banova Jaruga, a village in Croatia
Banov (surname)